Sonia Livingstone  is a professor of Social Psychology and former head of the Department of Media and Communications at the London School of Economics and Political Science and has dedicated much of her research to children, media and the Internet. She is author or editor of eighteen books and many academic articles and chapters. She has been visiting professor at the Universities of Bergen, Copenhagen, Harvard, Illinois, Milan, Paris II, and Stockholm, and is on the editorial board of several leading journals. From 2007 to 2008, she served as president of the International Communication Association (ICA). Sonia Livingstone was awarded the title of Officer of the Order of the British Empire (OBE) in 2014 "for services to children and child Internet safety".

Academic career
Sonia Livingstone holds a BSc degree in psychology from University College London and obtained her PhD in Psychology from the University of Oxford. Her doctoral research was funded by the Economic and Social Research Council and her dissertation examined the "social knowledge and programme structure in representations of television characters". In 1990, Sonia Livingstone joined the London School of Economics in the Department of Social Psychology as lecturer, from 1997 as senior lecturer and from 1999 as professor. Since 2003, she has been a professor in the then newly founded Department of Media and Communications at LSE. She teaches Master's courses in media and communications theory, methods, and audiences, and supervises doctoral students researching questions of audience, publics and users in the changing media landscape. Throughout her career, Livingstone has won numerous awards and taken up more than 15 academic appointments, most recently as guest professor at the University of Oslo (2008), as visiting professor at the University Panthéon Assas Paris II (2009) and completed a faculty fellowship at the Berkman Center for Internet & Society at Harvard University (2013-2014).

Major Contributions and Research Expertise
Sonia Livingstone stated that one of her research interests is exploring how people "maintain a sense of themselves in a communication environment replete with meanings they didn't create".  In her earliest research, Livingstone focused on how television audiences respond and create meaning from various television genres, focusing specifically on soap operas. This work was recognized for the innovative way in which she combined critical and social psychological theoretical frameworks and employed qualitative interview research methodologies, traditions that she still identifies with today. Her work in relation to children's use of the internet seeks to go beyond common assumptions. In "Risk and Harm on the Internet," she "presented the main findings and policy recommendations that emerge from the EU Kids Online project, focusing on the relation between opportunities, risk, and harm.  She argued that, "although both research and policy have tended to treat these as separable parts of children’s experience, the two are inextricably inter-twined". "Taking a comparative, critical and contextualised approach, Sonia Livingstone's current research asks why and how the changing conditions of mediation are reshaping everyday practices and possibilities for action, identity and communication rights. Her empirical work examines the opportunities and risks afforded by digital and online technologies, including for children and young people at home and school, for developments in media and digital literacies, and for audiences, publics and the public sphere more generally. More broadly, she is interested in how citizen values (public sphere, rights-based, equity-focused, diversity-promoting) can be better embedded in information and communication infrastructures in institutions, regulators and the lifeworld. Livingstone is renowned for her multi-methodological approaches and she has overseen projects incorporating both large-scale quantitative and qualitative methods in the study of media engagement and reception.

Selected Research Projects

UK Children Go Online: Emerging Opportunities and Dangers
The project investigated 9-19 year old's use of the Internet through qualitative interviews with children and parents. Accounting for age, socio-economic background, gender and other demographics, the study aimed to understand issues around (i) Internet access; (ii) the nature of Internet use; (iii) inequalities and the digital divide; (iv) education, learning and literacy; (v) communication; (vi) participation; (vii) various risks of associated with the Internet and balancing these; and (viii) regulating the Internet at home.

EU Kids Online I
EU Kids Online I (2006-2009) was a European research project on cultural, contextual and risk issues in children's safe use of the Internet and new media which was funded by the European Commission Safer Internet Programme. It examined research findings from 21 European countries (19 EU member states, plus Iceland and Norway) into how children and young people use the Internet and new online technologies. The aim was to identify comparable findings across Europe and evaluate the social, cultural and regulatory influences affecting online opportunities and risks, along with children's and 
parents’ responses, in order to inform policy. It has charted available data, pinpointed gaps and identified factors shaping the capability of 
European research institutions.

EU Kids Online II
EU Kids Online II was the follow up project which ran from 2009 to 2011. It focussed on enhancing knowledge regarding European children's use, risk and safety online. "Enhancing the knowledge base is understood as (i) producing new, relevant, robust and comparable findings regarding the incidence of online risk among European children; (ii) pinpointing which children are particularly at risk and why, by examining vulnerability factors (at both individual and country levels); and (iii) examining the operation and effectiveness of parental regulation and awareness strategies, and children’s own coping responses to risk, including their media literacy". The study has generated a substantial body of new data – rigorously collected and cross-nationally comparable – on European children's access, use, opportunities, risks and safety practices regarding the Internet and online technologies. Significantly, findings come from interviews conducted directly with 25,000 children and their parents from 25 countries across Europe.

EU Kids Online III
EU Kids Online III is the final follow up project which runs from 2011 to 2014. It will (i) identify all available research, update and extend the EU Kids Online publicly accessible database (adding summaries of recent findings and including all member states) to pinpoint strengths and gaps in the existing evidence base; (ii) conduct in depth statistical analyses of the comparative data from EU  Kids Online II in response to the questions arising from ongoing research and policy debates, and will publish these in a series of concise research reports; and (iii) explore new and creative ways to research the meanings of risk online for children, using methodological innovations and traditional approaches to generate focused and comparable qualitative findings.

The Class
Sonia Livingstone also directs The Class (ongoing), a research project that examines the emerging mix of on- and offline experiences in teenagers’ daily learning lives. It focusses on the fluctuating web of peer-to-peer networks that may cut across institutional boundaries, adult values and established practices of learning and leisure. In an ordinary London school, the project follows the networks within and beyond a single class of 13-14-year-olds at home, school and elsewhere over the course of an academic year – observing social interactions in and between lessons; conducting interviews with children, parents, teachers and relevant others; and mapping out-of-school engagements with digital networking technologies to reveal both patterns of use and the quality and meaning of such engagements as they shape the learning opportunities of young people. The Class is part of the MacArthur Foundation-funded Connected Learning Research Network.

Involvement

Sonia Livingstone works with a variety of other research teams, participates in the European COST network, Transforming Audiences, Transforming Societies, and leads ECREA's (European Communication Research and Education Association) Children, Youth and Media group. She also serves on the Executive Board of the UK's Council for Child Internet Safety, for which she is the Evidence Champion. She has served on the Department of Education's Ministerial Taskforce for Home Access to Technology for Children, the Home Secretary's Taskforce for Child Protection on the Internet and the boards of Voice of the Listener and Viewer and the Internet Watch Foundation. She has advised Ofcom, the Department for Education, the Home Office, the Economic and Social Research Council, the BBC, The Byron Review, UNICEF, ITU, OECD, the European Parliament, and the Higher Education Funding Council for England. From 2007 - 2008, she served as president of the International Communication Association, has served as a member of the organization's different committees at various times and continues her engagement as an ICA fellow.

Sonia Livingstone was appointed Officer of the Order of the British Empire (OBE) in the Queen's 2014 New Year Honours for services to children and child Internet safety. In July 2018 she was elected Fellow of the British Academy (FBA).

Selected publications

Recently Authored Books
 Livingstone, S. (2002) Young People and New Media: Childhood and the Changing Media Environment. London: Sage. 275 pp.
 Millwood Hargrave, A., and Livingstone, S., with others (2006) Harm and Offence in Media Content: A review of the empirical literature. Bristol: Intellect Press. 256 pp.
 Millwood Hargrave, A., and Livingstone, S., with others (2009) Harm and Offence in Media Content: A review of the empirical literature. Bristol: Intellect Press. Fully revised second edition (2009). 
 Livingstone, S. (2006) Lo Spettatore Intraprendente: Analisi del pubblico televisivo. Trans. D. Cardini. Rome: Carocci. 201 pp.
 Couldry, N., Livingstone, S., and Markham, T. (2007) Media Consumption and Public Engagement: Beyond the Presumption of Attention. Houndmills: Palgrave. 247 pp.
 Couldry, N., Livingstone, S., and Markham, T. (2010) Media Consumption and Public Engagement: Beyond the Presumption of Attention. Houndmills: Palgrave. Thoroughly revised second edition.
 Livingstone, S. (2009) Children and the Internet: Great Expectations, Challenging Realities. Cambridge: Polity. 302 pp. Translated into Italian by Piermarco Aroldi as Ragazzi online: Crescere con internet nella società digitale, published by Vita e Pensiero, Milano (2010). Translation into Chinese (simplified). PHEI Publishing House of Electronics Industry, Beijing (due 2013).
 Lunt, P., and Livingstone, S. (2012) Media Regulation: Governance and the interests of citizens and consumers. London: Sage. 216 pp.

Recently Authored Book Chapters

Recently Edited Books
 Drotner, K., and Livingstone, S. (Eds.). (2008) The International Handbook of Children, Media and Culture. London: Sage. 537 pp.
 Lievrouw, L., and Livingstone, S. (Eds.) (2009) New Media. Sage Benchmarks in Communication (Volumes 1-4). London: Sage. 1427 pp. 
 Livingstone, S., and Haddon, L. (Eds.) (2009) Kids Online: Opportunities and Risks for Children. Bristol: The Policy Press. 272 pp.
 Livingstone, S., Haddon, L., and Görzig, A. (Eds.) (2012) Children, Risk and Safety Online: Research and policy challenges in comparative perspective. Bristol: The Policy Press. 382 pp. 
 Butsch, R., and Livingstone, S. (Eds.) (2013) Meanings of Audiences: Comparative discourses. London: Routledge.

Recent Peer-Reviewed Journal Articles
 Staksrud, E., Ólafsson, K., and Livingstone, S. (2013) Does the use of social networking sites increase children’s risk of harm? Computers in Human Behavior, 29(1): 40–50.
 Lunt, P., and Livingstone, S. (2013) Media studies’ fascination with the concept of the public sphere: critical reflections and emerging debates. Media, Culture & Society, 35(1): 87–96.
 Livingstone, S. (2013) The participation paradigm in audience research. Communication Review. 16: 1–2, 21–30. 
 Livingstone, S., Ólafsson, K., and Staksrud, E. (2013) Risky social networking practices among ‘underage’ users: Lessons for evidence-based policy. Journal for Computer-Mediated Communication. 18(3): 303–320. 
 Ringrose, J., Harvey, L., Gill, R., and Livingstone, S. (2013) Teen girls, sexual double standards and ‘sexting’: Gendered value in digital image exchange, Feminist Theory, 14(3): 305–323.
 Livingstone, S. (2013) Online risk, harm and vulnerability: Reflections on the evidence base for child internet safety policy. ZER: Journal of Communication Studies, 18: 13–28.

External links 
 Complete publications list through LSE Research Online.
 Profile page on LSE website.

References

Social psychologists
Living people
Berkman Fellows
Alumni of University College London
Academics of the London School of Economics
1960 births
Officers of the Order of the British Empire
Fellows of the British Academy